The Reverend George Saville Woods (13 September 1886 – 9 July 1951) was a British Unitarian minister and Labour and Co-operative politician.

The son of Thomas William and Alice Antice Woods, he was educated at Handsworth College, Birmingham and Manchester College, Oxford. From 1914 to 1921 Woods served as minister at Mary Street Chapel, Taunton, Somerset, and from 1921 as minister of York Unitarian Chapel.

He became active in the co-operative movement and labour politics, holding at different times the chairmanship of the Taunton Labour Party, the York Labour Party and the York Co-operative Society. He was elected to the York Board of Guardians and York City Council. In 1929 and 1931 he fought the Yorkshire seat of Barkston Ash but could not defeat the Conservative candidate.

At the 1935 general election he was elected as Member of Parliament (MP) for Finsbury in London, unseating George Masterman Gillett of the National Labour Organisation. Due to the Second World War, the next election was not held until 1945. Woods was elected as MP for Mossley in Lancashire. When the Mossley seat was abolished in 1950, he was elected for the new seat of Droylsden, and was its member at the time of his death in a York hospital in July 1951, aged 64.

References

External links 
 

1886 births
Labour Co-operative MPs for English constituencies
UK MPs 1935–1945
UK MPs 1945–1950
1951 deaths
Place of birth missing